Androhibe Antsahadinta is a rural municipality in Analamanga Region, in the  Central Highlands of Madagascar. It belongs to the district of Antananarivo-Atsimondrano and its populations numbers to 10,434 in 2019  of which 90% are farmers.

It is located at 20 km South-West from the capital Antananarivo.
To the municipality belong 8 fokontany (villages) that are: Antalaho, Androhibe, Ambohibary, Antsahadinta, Mandalova, Fidasiana, Ankadivory and Ambatomalaza.

Rova of Antsahadinta
One of the Twelve sacred hills of Imerina, the Rova of Antsahadinta is located in the municipality.

References

Populated places in Analamanga